Shahrukh, Shahrokh  or Shah Rukh is a Persian name meaning "royal face" (shah means "king", while rukh means "face"). It may refer to:

People
Shah Rukh (1377–1447), ruler of the Timurid empire
Shahrukh Bey, first Khan of Kokand Khanate
Shahrukh Afshar (c. 1730–1796), Iranian king
Shahrokh Bayani (born 1960), Iranian footballer
Shahrokh Meskoob (1924–2005), Iranian writer
Shahrokh Moshkin Ghalam (born 1967), Iranian folkloric dancer and theatre director
Shahrukh Husain (born 1950), Pakistani author
Shah Rukh Khan (born 1965), Indian actor, producer, television personality and philanthropist
Muhammad Shah Rukh (born 1926), Pakistani field hockey player and cyclist

Other
Shahrokh (mythical bird), in Iranian literature

See also
Roc (mythology)
Simurgh, a mythical bird in Iranian mythology

Persian masculine given names
Pakistani masculine given names